Inman Township may refer to one of the following places in the United States:

 Inman Township, Otter Tail County, Minnesota
 Inman Township, Holt County, Nebraska

Township name disambiguation pages